Héctor Enrique Olivares (18 February 1958 − 12 May 2019) was an Argentine politician, engineer and agricultural producer. A representative of the Radical Civic Union (UCR), he served as a member of the Chamber of Deputies from 2015 until his death in 2019. He was born in La Rioja.

On 9 May 2019, Olivares and his adviser, Miguel Marcelo Yadón, were critically wounded after being shot in Buenos Aires. The men were transferred to nearby Hospital Ramos Mejía, where Yadón was pronounced dead on arrival. Olivares succumbed to his injuries on 12 May 2019.

References

1958 births
2019 deaths
21st-century Argentine politicians
20th-century Argentine engineers
Assassinated Argentine politicians
Members of the Argentine Chamber of Deputies elected in La Rioja
People murdered in Argentina
People from La Rioja Province, Argentina
Radical Civic Union politicians